The Rheinsberg Music Academy is an academy for music in Rheinsberg, Brandenburg, Germany. It was co-founded by Ulrike Liedtke and is now a national and state institution, educating both lay people and professionals. It is based at Schloss Rheinsberg and uses the theatre there for performances.

History 

Rheinsberg Music Academy is a facility for young performers on the grounds of Schloss Rheinsberg, co-founded by the musicologist Ulrike Liedtke in 1991. In 2001, it became a national academy (Bundesakademie), which has been run from 2014 by Musikkultur Rheinsberg, supported by the Ministry of Culture of Brandenburg, the Ostprignitz-Ruppin district and the town of Rheinsberg. As of 2020, the artistic director is Georg Quander and the director is Felix Görg; the CEO of Musikkultur Rheinsberg is Thomas Falk.

As an educational institution, the academy conducts workshops, master classes, and scientific seminars (Kolloquien) related to music. In 2019/20, master classes were given by singer Waltraud Meier, stage director Harry Kupfer and conductor René Jacobs, among others. A focus is the performance of works by young composers and composers who were neglected during the GDR regime. Some compositions were commissioned by the academy to be premiered in Rheinsberg. Annually, around 40 courses and 130 events are held, attracting 17,000 visitors.

The Kavalierhaus, which had deteriorated, was restored after the Wende and reopened in 1999 as the seat of the institution. The main hall is a simple modern room within the historic walls. Events of the academy and the opera festival Kammeroper Schloss Rheinsberg are held there and at the Schlosstheater. Both institutions reside in the Kavalierhaus.

References

Further reading 
 Ulrike Liedtke (ed.): Frau Musica heute: Konzepte für Kompositionen. Rheinsberger Pfingstwerkstatt Neue Musik, Musikakademie Rheinsberg, Hofmeister, Leipzig 2005, 
 Ulrike Liedtke (ed.): "Jeder nach seiner Fasson": musikalische Neuansätze heute. Musikakademie Rheinsberg, Pfau, Saarbrücken 1997, 
 Ulrike Liedtke (ed.): Die Rheinsberger Hofkapelle von Friedrich II.: Musiker auf dem Weg zum Berliner "Capell-Bedienten". Veröffentlichung der Musikakademie Rheinsberg, Rheinsberg 1995, 2nd revised edition, Hofmeister, Leipzig 2005, 
 Christoph Schaffrath: Ouverture ex A-Dur: due violini, viola et basso; N. 4. (first publication) Musikakademie Rheinsberg, Werner Feja, Berlin 1996
 Frank Wendler: Zehn Jahre Musikakademie Rheinsberg. Musikakademie Rheinsberg, Rheinsberg 2001
 Helmut Zapf, Raphael Heinrich, Gerd Domhardt, Matthias Jann: Neue Musik in Rheinsberg: Auftragswerke der Musikakademie Rheinsberg. NCA – New Classical Adventure, What a Beautiful Noise, Stansstad 1998

External links 
 
 
 Musikakademie und Schlosstheater Rheinsberg 2020 (in German) kulturfeste.de 2020

Music schools in Germany
Schools in Brandenburg
Culture of Brandenburg